Ant-Man (Original Motion Picture Soundtrack) is the film score for the Marvel Studios film Ant-Man. The score was composed by Christophe Beck. Hollywood Records released the album digitally on July 17, 2015, and in physical formats on August 7, 2015.

One additional song, "Plainsong" by The Cure, is featured in the movie, but was not included on the soundtrack album. Siri plays the song as Yellowjacket and Ant-Man are fighting inside a briefcase near the end of the film.

Background
In February 2014, director Edgar Wright tweeted that Steven Price would score the film. However, Price left soon after Wright's departure from the project in May 2014. In January 2015, Christophe Beck, who worked with Wright's replacement Peyton Reed on Bring It On, was hired to replace Price. Describing the film's score, Beck said, "For Ant-Man, I wanted to write a score in the grand symphonic tradition of my favorite superhero movies, with a sweeping scope and a big, catchy main theme. What makes this score stand out among other Marvel movies, though, is a sneaky sense of fun since it is, after all, not only a superhero movie, but also a heist comedy." The soundtrack was released digitally on July 17, 2015, and in physical media on August 7.

Track listing

References

2015 soundtrack albums
2010s film soundtrack albums
Ant-Man (film series)
Marvel Cinematic Universe: Phase Two soundtracks